Izak van der Merwe and Raven Klaasen were the defending champions, but not to participate.

Farrukh Dustov and Malek Jaziri won the title, defeating Ilija Bozoljac and Roman Jebavý in the final, 6–3, 6–3.

Seeds

Draw

Draw

References
Main Draw

Fergana Challenger - Men's Doubles
2013 Men's Doubles